Gary Higginson (born 1952) is a British composer. Higginson trained at the Guildhall School of Music and Drama under Edmund Rubbra, Patric Standford, Buxton Orr and Alfred Nieman then at Birmingham University under John Joubert.

Recordings
Songs of Innocence and Experience, Charlotte de Rothschild (soprano), Danielle Perrett (harp) Ely Cathedral Girls’ Choir and the Chapel Choir of Selwyn College, Cambridge, directed by Sarah MacDonald. Regent

References

English composers
Living people
1952 births